The 2018–19 Club Atlético Boca Juniors season was the 90th consecutive Primera División season for the senior squad. During the season, Boca Juniors took part in the Primera División, Copa de la Superliga, 2017–18 Copa Argentina, 2018–19 Copa Argentina, Supercopa Argentina, Final Stages of the 2018 Copa Libertadores and in the Group Stage of the 2019 Copa Libertadores.

Season overview

June
Frank Fabra is ruled out of the 2018 FIFA World Cup after sustaining an anterior cruciate ligament tear in his left knee, also, he will miss the entire 2018 Copa Libertadores. On June 27 Boca announced that Sebastián Villa is the first signing of the season, after reaching an agreement with Colombian champions Deportes Tolima.

July
Gino Peruzzi, Nicolás Colazo, Tomás Pochettino, Marcelo Torres, Franco Cristaldo, Nicolás Benegas and Nazareno Solís returned from their loans. Oscar Benítez returned to their club after a loan spell in Boca. Franco Cristaldo and Nazareno Solís are loaned to San Martín (SJ) and Nicolás Benegas is loaned to Brown. On July 6, two players arrive to the club: Carlos Izquierdoz is purchased from Santos Laguna and Mauro Zárate is purchased from Watford. Marcelo Torres is loaned to Banfield. On July 16 Walter Bou is loaned to Vitória and Nicolás Colazo is loaned to Aris. Left back Lucas Olaza is loaned from Talleres (C), in the operation Tomás Pochettino and Gonzalo Maroni are loaned to Talleres (C).

August
The first official match of the season is a 6–0 win against Alvarado in the Round of 64 of Copa Argentina, in the next round Boca will face San Martín (T). On August 2, Boca and Lanús reached an agreement for the transfer of goalkeeper Esteban Andrada while Guillermo Sara is transferred to Lanús. In the first game of the Round of 16 of Copa Libertadores, Boca achieved a great victory 2–0  against Libertad. Guido Vadalá is loaned to Universidad de Concepción. The first match of the Argentinian tournament was a 1–0 victory over Talleres (C). Boca played awful and lost 2–0 against Estudiantes (LP), Boca's 46 rounds as leader came to the end. The level did not improved and Boca drew 0–0 against Huracán. Boca and Santiago Vergini agreed to mutually terminate the defender's contract, Vergini subsequently joined Bursaspor. In the second leg of the Round of 16 of Copa Libertadores, Boca won 4–2 against Libertad and advanced to the Quarterfinals, facing Brazilian team Cruzeiro.

September
Boca improved the level and managed to win 3–0 over Vélez Sarsfield. Sebastián Pérez Cardona is loaned to Pachuca. Boca advanced to the Round of 16 after a 2–0 win over San Martín (T). On September 15, Boca won 1-0 a really though match against Argentinos Juniors. In the first leg of the Quarterfinals of Copa Libertadores, Boca won 2–0 against Cruzeiro. Boca played a bad game and lost 2-0 the Superclásico against River Plate. Boca was eliminated of the 2017–18 Copa Argentina after an awful defeat against Gimnasia y Esgrima (LP). On the last match of September, Boca won 3–1 over Colón.

October
In the second leg of the Quarterfinals of Copa Libertadores, Boca drew 1–1 against Cruzeiro and advanced to the Semifinals, facing Brazilian team Palmeiras. On October, 7 Boca drew 2–2 against Racing. Goalkeeper Carlos Lampe signs with Boca on a three-month loan from Huachipato. On October 20, Boca drew 0–0 against Rosario Central. In the first leg of the Semifinals of Copa Libertadores, Boca played a great match and won 2–0 over Palmeiras. On October 27, the reserve team played and lost 2–1 against Gimnasia y Esgrima (LP). Boca qualified to the Finals of the 2018 Copa Libertadores after defeating Palmeiras, and will face old time rival River Plate in an unprecedented edition of the Superclásico. Boca also becomes the team with most finals disputed in the history of Copa Libertadores.

November
In the first match of the month, Boca won 4–1 against Tigre. The first leg of the 2018 Copa Libertadores Finals ended in a 2–2 draw, a very disputed match. On the round 13 of Superliga, Boca defeated Patronato 1–0.

December
In the first match of the month, Boca won 1–0 against Independiente. Boca lost the 2018 Copa Libertadores after losing 3–1 in the finals against old rival River Plate. Guillermo Barros Schelotto is no longer the coach of Boca, after two years that included two Argentine League trophies. Edwin Cardona finished his loan with the club and returned to Monterrey.

January
Gustavo Alfaro is appointed as the new manager of the club. Cristian Espinoza and Carlos Lampe finished their loans with the club and returned to Villarreal and Huachipato. Nahuel Molina returned from their loan on Defensa y Justicia. On January 2, Boca and Ajax reached an agreement for the transfer of defender Lisandro Magallán. Central defender Júnior Alonso is loaned from Lille. Sebastián Pérez Cardona is loaned to Barcelona. Goalkeeper Marcos Díaz signed with the club. Boca and Borussia Dortmund reached an agreement for the transfer of defender Leonardo Balerdi. Gonzalo Lamardo is loaned to San Martín (T). Jorman Campuzano is purchased from Atlético Nacional and Iván Marcone is purchased from Cruz Azul. On January 18, Boca and San Lorenzo reached an agreement for the transfer of defender Gino Peruzzi. Pablo Pérez is loaned to Independiente, and Leonardo Jara is loaned to D.C. United. Nahuel Molina is loaned to Rosario Central. The first match of the year was a 1–1 against Newell's Old Boys. Right back Kevin Mac Allister is loaned from Argentinos Juniors. Nicolás Colazo is loaned to Tigre and Mateo Retegui is loaned to Estudiantes (LP). Central defender Lisandro López is loaned from Benfica. Boca purchases a percentage of Lucas Olaza from Talleres (C) and is loaned to Celta de Vigo. Walter Bou is loaned to Unión La Calera. Boca won 4–0 against San Martín (SJ) in one of the matches postponed.

February
Boca and Zenit Saint Petersburg reached an agreement for the transfer of defensive midfielder Wílmar Barrios. Boca won Godoy Cruz 2–0. Agustín Heredia is loaned to Godoy Cruz. On February 10, Boca travelled to Córdoba and drew 1–1 against Belgrano. On February 17 Boca defeated Lanús 2–1. Boca lost 2–1 against Atlético Tucumán in one of the matches postponed. Agustín Rossi is loaned to Deportes Antofagasta. On February 24 Boca won 1–0 against Defensa y Justicia.

March
On March 1 Boca won 3–1 against Unión. In the beginning of 2019 Copa Libertadores Boca draw Jorge Wilstermann 0-0. On March 9 Boca won 3–0 against San Lorenzo. On March 12 Boca won 3–0 over Deportes Tolima. On March 14, Boca and Fernando Gago agreed to a contract termination; he played 199 games and won 9 titles. On March 9 Boca won 4–1 against San Martín (T) and qualified for 2020 Copa Libertadores. On March 29 Boca won 2–0 against Banfield.

April
On April 2 Boca lost 3–0 against Athletico Paranaense. In the final round of Superliga, Boca drew 1–1 against Aldosivi and ended the League in the third position. On April 10 Boca won 4–0 against Jorge Wilstermann. On April 19 Boca won the first match of 2018–19 Copa Argentina 2–0 against Estudiantes (RC). On April 24 Boca draw 2–2 against Deportes Tolima in Copa Libertadores. On April 28 Boca won 2–1 against Godoy Cruz in Copa de la Superliga.

May
On May 2 Boca won the Supercopa Argentina against Rosario Central defeating them 6–5 in penalties after a 0–0 draw. On May 5 Boca advanced to the quarterfinals of Copa de la Superliga by winning 3–1 against Godoy Cruz. On May 9 Boca Won 2–1 against Athletico Paranaense and clinched the first place in the Group G of Copa Libertadores. On May 12, Boca draw Vélez Sarsfield 0–0 in the first leg of Copa de la Superliga quarterfinals. On May 16, Boca won 5–4 in penalties after another 0–0 draw against Vélez Sarsfield and advanced to the semifinals. On May 19, Boca draw Argentinos Juniors 0–0 in the first leg of Copa de la Superliga semifinals. On May 26, Boca won 1–0 against Argentinos Juniors and advanced to the Copa de la Superliga final.

June
On June 2 Boca played the last match of the season, a 2–0 defeat against Tigre in the final of the Copa de la Superliga.

Current squad

Last updated on June 3, 2019.

Transfers

In

Winter

Summer

Out

Winter

Summer

Pre-season and friendlies

Winter

Joan Gamper Trophy

Summer

Competitions

Overall

1: The Round of 32 will be played in the next season.
2: The group stage was played the previous season.
3: The final stages are played in the next season.

Primera División

League table

Relegation table

Results summary

Results by round

Matches

Copa de la Superliga

Round of 16

Quarterfinals

Semifinals

Final

2017–18 Copa Argentina

Round of 64

Round of 32

Round of 16

2018–19 Copa Argentina

Round of 64

Supercopa Argentina

2018 Copa Libertadores

Final Stages

Round of 16

Quarterfinals

Semifinals

Finals

2019 Copa Libertadores

Group stage

Team statistics

Season Appearances and goals

|-
! colspan="16" style="background:#00009B; color:gold; text-align:center"| Goalkeepers

|-
! colspan="16" style="background:#00009B; color:gold; text-align:center"| Defenders

|-
! colspan="16" style="background:#00009B; color:gold; text-align:center"| Midfielders

|-
! colspan="16" style="background:#00009B; color:gold; text-align:center"| Forwards

|-
! colspan="16" style="background:#00009B; color:gold; text-align:center"| Players who have made an appearance or had a squad number this season, but have left the club

|}

Top scorers

Top assists

Penalties

Clean sheets

Disciplinary record

Notes

References

External links
 Club Atlético Boca Juniors official web site 

Club Atlético Boca Juniors seasons
Boca Juniors